Sakata is a Bantu dialect cluster of DR Congo. The dialects are rather divergent: Sakata proper, Djia (Wadia), Bai (Kibay), Tuku (Ketu, Batow).

According to Glottolog, it may be one of the Teke languages.

References

Bangi-Ntomba languages
Languages of the Democratic Republic of the Congo